is a 1961 Japanese film directed by Yasujirō Ozu for Toho Films. It was entered into the 12th Berlin International Film Festival. The film was his penultimate; only An Autumn Afternoon (1962) followed it, which he made for Shochiku Films.

Plot
Manbei Kohayagawa (Nakamura Ganjirō II) is the head of a small sake brewery company outside Kyoto, with two daughters and a widowed daughter-in-law. His daughter-in-law, Akiko (Setsuko Hara), and youngest daughter, Noriko (Yoko Tsukasa), live in Osaka. Akiko helps out at an art gallery and has a son Minoru. Noriko, unmarried, is an office worker. Manbei's other daughter, Fumiko (Michiyo Aratama), lives with him.  Her husband, Hisao, helps at the brewery and they have a young son Masao.

Manbei asks his brother-in-law Kitagawa (Daisuke Katō) to find Akiko a husband, and Kitagawa lets Akiko meet a friend of his, Isomura Eiichirou (Hisaya Morishige), a widower, at a pub.  Isomura is enthusiastic about the match but Akiko is hesitant.  Manbei also asks Kitagawa to arrange a matchmaking session for Noriko, who is in love with Teramoto (Akira Takarada) but doesn't express it since Teramoto is moving to Sapporo to be an assistant professor.

During summer Manbei sneaks out constantly to meet his old flame, a former mistress by the name of Sasaki Tsune (Chieko Naniwa).  Sasaki has a grown-up, rather Westernized daughter Yuriko who may or may not be Manbei's own daughter.  When Fumiko finds out Manbei has been seeing Sasaki again, she is angered and confronts her father, but Manbei denies the whole affair.

The Kohayagawa family meets for a memorial service for their late mother at Arashiyama. Manbei has a heart attack after quarrelling with Fumiko over Sasaki, but wakes up feeling refreshed the next day.  Akiko asks Noriko about another recent matchmaking session, and while Noriko admits to having a fun time, she reveals that she is still pining for Teramoto.

In a secret trip out with Sasaki to and back from Osaka, Manbei has another heart attack, and dies shortly after. Sasaki informs the daughters of what happened.  The ailing Kohayagawa brewery is to be merged with a business rival's, while Noriko decides to go to Sapporo to search out Teramoto.  At the film's end, the Kohayagawa family gathers and reminisces about Manbei's life as his body is cremated.

Cast

Production
In order to secure its contract stars Setsuko Hara and Yoko Tsukasa from Toho for his prior film Late Autumn, Ozu agreed to direct The End of Summer for the studio, making it his only Toho film and the only one of three not produced for Shochiku (the others were Floating Weeds for Daiei and The Munekata Sisters for Shintoho). As a result, the film is filled with Toho players, many of whom took the opportunity to appear in their only Ozu film, including marquee headliners Hisaya Morishige and Akira Takarada taking small roles. Ozu added a scene at the end to accommodate star Yūko Mochizuki, who requested to be in the film, and his signature player Chishū Ryū.

Reception
Dennis Schwartz praised The End of Summer as a "deft blending of comedy and tragedy", writing that Manbei's "lively antics give the film a wonderfully playful tone."

Filmmaker Eugène Green, who gave the film one of his ten votes in the 2012 Sight & Sound directors' poll of the world's best films, wrote that it "stands out as a meditation on death, with certain shots of an extraordinary power and beauty. The scenes between the two sisters are deeply moving." Filmmaker Ashim Ahluwalia also mentioned the film as one of his top ten of all time, writing: "End of Summer is a poignant, near-perfect film about endings, made a year before Ozu died."

References

External links
 
 
 DVD Verdict Review
 The End of Summer at Ozu-san.com

1961 films
1961 drama films
Japanese drama films
1960s Japanese-language films
Toho films
Films set in Kyoto
Films directed by Yasujirō Ozu
Films with screenplays by Yasujirō Ozu
Films with screenplays by Kogo Noda
Films produced by Sanezumi Fujimoto
1960s Japanese films